Alexander Payer  (born 12 September 1989) is an Austrian snowboarder.
 
He competed in the 2017 FIS Snowboard World Championships, and in the 2018 Winter Olympics, in parallel giant slalom.

References

External links

1989 births
Living people
Austrian male snowboarders
Olympic snowboarders of Austria
Snowboarders at the 2018 Winter Olympics
Snowboarders at the 2022 Winter Olympics
Place of birth missing (living people)
Universiade medalists in snowboarding
Universiade bronze medalists for Austria
Competitors at the 2015 Winter Universiade
People from Sankt Veit an der Glan
Sportspeople from Carinthia (state)
21st-century Austrian people